Andreas Albrecht (Nuremberg 1586 – Hamburg 1628) was a German mathematician and engineer. Albrecht invented a variety of instruments, some of which are described in his treatises on architecture and perspective: Instrument zur Architectur (Nuremberg, 1622); Eygendliche Beschreibung (Nuremberg, 1625); and Duo Libri. Prior de Perspectiva ... Posterior de umbra ... (Nuremberg, 1625).

References

External links 

German scientific instrument makers
16th-century German mathematicians
17th-century German mathematicians
Scientists from Nuremberg